is a railway station in the city of Toyokawa, Aichi, Japan, operated by Meitetsu.

Lines
Ina Station is served by the Meitetsu Nagoya Main Line and is 5.0 kilometers from the terminus of the line at Toyohashi Station.

Station layout
The station has one side platform and two island platforms connected by a footbridge. However, platforms 1 and 5 are not in use. The station has automated ticket machines, Manaca automated turnstiles and is staffed.

Platforms

Adjacent stations

Station history
Ina Station was opened on 1 June 1927 as a station on the Aichi Electric Railway. On 1 April 1935, the Aichi Electric Railway merged with the Nagoya Railroad (the forerunner of present-day Meitetsu). A new station building was completed in March 1996.

Passenger statistics
In fiscal 2017, the station was used by an average of 1599 passengers daily.

Surrounding area
 Nishi-Kozakai Station
 Kozakai Station

See also
 List of Railway Stations in Japan

References

External links

 Official web page 

Railway stations in Japan opened in 1927
Railway stations in Aichi Prefecture
Stations of Nagoya Railroad
Toyokawa, Aichi